Twiins (often stylised as TWiiNS) is a Slovak twin pop duo consisting of sisters Daniela and Veronika Nízlová. They were born on 15 May 1986 in Hronský Beňadik. They are best known for representing Slovakia in the Eurovision Song Contest 2011 with the song "I'm Still Alive".

The twins were background singers and dancers for Tereza Kerndlová, the Czech entry in the Eurovision Song Contest 2008. The duo is known for their cover of Italian singer Sabrina Salerno's Boys (Summertime Love) under the title Boys, Boys, Boys featuring Carlprit in January 2010.

Twiins released "One Night Stand" featuring Flo Rida in 2012. They performed during his shows in Germany and Miami, Florida. Twiins are working on their second English-language singing album in Los Angeles, California with American songwriter and producer Bryan Todd.

Career
Daniela and Veronika Nízlová attended the same schools and had a shared dream of becoming an international pop duet. At the completion of secondary school, they attended Comenius University of Management. They both graduated with a Bachelor of Arts degree in management. 

Shortly after completing school in 2000, they were scouted by a major Slovakian record label that offered them a recording deal. The Twiins formed a joint venture and released four albums for which they were awarded three Golden records and one Platinum record. 

They hosted their own TV show Hitbox for four years on TV Markiza. 

They also made their acting debut playing leading roles as Tereza in the musical Rebelove showcased in Prague's Broadway Theatre and Bratislava.

Eurovision 2011
Twiins represented Slovakia at the Eurovision Song Contest 2011 with their song, "I'm Still Alive" which failed to qualify for the final. They gave Slovakia their best result since re-entering the competition in 2009. The song was co-written and produced by Bryan Todd. The song peaked at number 18 in Slovakia.

Fourth studio album: 2012-present
In November 2013, the group released the single "One Night Stand" featuring American rapper Flo Rida. It reached number 69 in Poland.

Personal life
In 2003, Daniela Nízlová dated Washington Capitals goaltender Rastislav Staňa. On May 15, 2010, Daniela Jančichová (née Nízlová) married Twiins manager Braňo Jančich. They divorced in 2013. 

In 2015, Veronika Krúpa-Nízlová (née Nízlová) married Tomáš Krúpa. They divorced in December 2020.

Discography

 Tweens (2000)
 Máme čas... (2001)
 Škrtni zápalkou (2003)
 Láska chce viac (2005)
 Compromise (2009)
 Zlatá brána dokorán (2021)

References

External links
Official website

1986 births
Living people
Eurovision Song Contest entrants of 2011
Twin musical duos
Eurovision Song Contest entrants for Slovakia
21st-century Slovak women singers
Slovak musical groups
Slovak twins
Musical groups established in 1996
Identical twin females
Female musical duos
Musical groups disestablished in 2019
Musical groups reestablished in 2021
Child musical groups